Events from the year 1673 in Denmark.

Incumbents 
 Monarch – Christian V

Events

Undated 
 Nysø Manor at Præstø is completed as the first manor house in Denmark to be designed in the Baroque style.
 Sophie Amalienborg is built in Copenhagen.

Births 
 13 October – Christoffer Gabel, statesman (born 1617)

Deaths

Full date unknown 
 Karen Andersdatter, mistress of Christian IV of Denmark

References 

 
Denmark
Years of the 17th century in Denmark